João Teixeira may refer to:
 João Teixeira Albernaz I (died 1662), Portuguese cartographer
 João Teixeira Soares de Sousa (1827–1875), Azorean entrepreneur
 João Teixeira de Faria (born 1942), Brazilian medium, known as João de Deus
 João Góis (born 1990), birth name João Duarte Teixeira Góis
 João Carlos Teixeira (born 1993), Portuguese footballer
 João Teixeira (footballer, born 1994), Portuguese footballer
 João Teixeira (footballer, born 1996), Portuguese footballer